The EU3 carriers commonly refer to three airline groups in the European Union:
International Airlines Group, parent of British Airways and Iberia
Air France-KLM, parent of Air France and KLM
Lufthansa Group, parent of Lufthansa, Austrian Airlines and Swiss International Air Lines